Herbert Lench Pottle (February 16, 1907 – September 21, 2002) was a Canadian politician, civil servant, magistrate and writer. He represented the electoral district of Carbonear-Bay de Verde in the Newfoundland and Labrador House of Assembly from 1949 to 1956. He was a member of the Liberal Party of Newfoundland and Labrador.

The son of William Pottle and Patience Evely, he was born in 1907 in Flatrock, Newfoundland and received his early education there. A clinical psychologist, he was an alumnus of Mount Allison University (B.A. 1932) and the University of Toronto (M.A. 1934, PhD 1937). Pottle married Muriel Ethel Moran in 1937; the couple had two daughters. He was employed by the Newfoundland Department of Education from 1939 to 1943. From 1943 to 1947, Pottle was a Child Welfare director and a judge in St. John's juvenile court.

From 1947 to 1949, he served in Newfoundland's Commission of Government as Commissioner for Home Affairs and Education. He was elected to the provincial assembly in 1949 and served in the Newfoundland cabinet as Minister of Public Welfare. Pottle resigned from cabinet in 1955. He was subsequently named secretary for the United Church of Canada's board of information and stewardship, serving until 1963. From 1963 to 1972, he served in the Canadian Department of Health and Welfare.

He died in Ottawa in 2002 at the age of 95.

Works 
 Dawn without Light, political memoir (1979)
 From the Nart Shore, autobiography (1983)
 Humour on the Rock (1983)

References

External links 

 Herbert Lench Pottle archival papers held at the University of Toronto Archives and Records Management Services

1907 births
2002 deaths
Liberal Party of Newfoundland and Labrador MHAs
Writers from Newfoundland and Labrador
Members of the Newfoundland Commission of Government
Dominion of Newfoundland judges